Gheer is a hamlet of Wallonia in the municipality of Comines-Warneton, district of Warneton, located in the province of Hainaut, Belgium.

The hamlet is situated on the Warneton - Ploegsteert road, approximately 15 km south of Ypres . 

The hamlet was completely destroyed in the First World War.

External links 
Le Gheer weather internet site
Weather Webcam in <le Gheer>
 Weather forecast at 8 days for <Le Gheer>
holiday rental in le Gheer
Maplandia

Populated places in Hainaut (province)
Comines-Warneton